Louis-Alexandre Berthier (20 November 1753 – 1 June 1815), Prince of Neuchâtel and Valangin, Prince of Wagram, was a French Marshal of the Empire who served during the French Revolutionary Wars and the Napoleonic Wars. He was twice Minister of War of France and served as chief of staff to Napoleon Bonaparte.

Born into a military family, Berthier served in the French Army and survived suspicion of monarchism during the Reign of Terror before a rapid rise in the ranks of the French Revolutionary Army. Although a key supporter of the coup against the Directory that gave Napoleon supreme power, and present for his greatest victories, Berthier strongly opposed the progressive stretching of lines of communication during the Russian campaign. Allowed to retire by the restored Bourbon regime, he died of unnatural causes shortly before the Battle of Waterloo. Berthier is regarded by many as one of the greatest administrators in history, whose talents were indispensable to Napoleon and the Grande Armèe.

Early life
Berthier was born on 20 November 1753 in Versailles to Lieutenant-colonel Jean-Baptiste Berthier (1721–1804), an officer in the Corps of Topographical Engineers, and his first wife (married in 1746) Marie Françoise L'Huillier de La Serre. He was the eldest of five children, with the three brothers also serving in the French Army, two becoming generals during the Napoleonic Wars.

Military career

As a boy, Berthier was instructed in the military art by his father, an officer of the Corps de genie (Engineer Corps). At the age of seventeen, he entered the army, serving successively in the staff, the engineers, and the Prince of Lambesc's Royal Allemand-Dragoon Regiment. In 1780, Berthier went to North America with General Rochambeau, and on his return, having attained the rank of colonel, he was employed in various staff posts and in a military mission to Prussia. During the French Revolution, as chief of staff of the Versailles National Guard, he protected the aunts of Louis XVI from popular violence, and aided their escape in 1791.

In 1792, Berthier was at once made chief of staff to Marshal Nicolas Luckner, and he bore a distinguished part in the Argonne campaign of Generals Dumouriez and Kellermann. He served with great credit in the War in the Vendée of 1793–1795, and the next year was made a general of division and chief of staff (major-général) to the Army of Italy, which Bonaparte had recently been appointed to command. He played an important role in the Battle of Rivoli, relieving General Joubert when the latter was attacked by the Austrian general Jozsef Alvinczi. His power of work, accuracy and quick comprehension, combined with his long and varied experience and his complete mastery of detail, made Berthier the ideal chief of staff. In this capacity, Berthier was Napoleon's most valued assistant for the rest of his career.

Berthier accompanied Napoleon throughout the campaign of 1796, and was left in charge of the army after the Treaty of Campo Formio. He was in this post in 1798 when he entered Italy, invaded the Vatican, organized the Roman Republic, and took Pope Pius VI prisoner. Berthier supervised the Pope’s relocation to Valence, where, after a tortuous journey, Pius died. The death of the Pope dealt a major blow to the Vatican's political power which, however, did not prove as ephemeral as that of the First French Empire.

After this, Berthier joined his chief in Egypt, serving there until Napoleon's return. He assisted in the Coup of 18 Brumaire (9 November 1799), afterwards becoming Minister of War for a time. During the Battle of Marengo, Berthier was the nominal head of the Army of Reserve, but the first consul accompanied the army and he acted in reality, as always, as chief of staff to Napoleon.

Lest one think that this was a relatively safe job, a contemporary subordinate staff officer, Brossier, reports that at the Battle of Marengo:

At the close of the campaign, he was employed in civil and diplomatic business. This included a mission to Spain in August 1800, which resulted in the retrocession of Louisiana to France by the Treaty of San Ildefonso on 1 October 1800, and led to the Louisiana Purchase.

When Napoleon became emperor, Berthier was at once made a Marshal of the Empire. He took part in the campaigns of Austerlitz, Jena, and Friedland. He was made Duke of Valangin in 1806 and Vice-Constable of the Empire in 1807. When Napoleon deposed King Frederick William III of Prussia from the principality of Neuchâtel, Berthier was appointed its ruler. This lasted until 1814 and also brought him the title of sovereign prince in 1806.

In 1808, he served in the Peninsular War, and in 1809, served in the Austrian theatre during the War of the Fifth Coalition, after which he was given the title of Prince of Wagram. He was with Napoleon in Russia in 1812, and took part in the extremely unusual council of war on whether to proceed, being one of several who advised against an advance on Moscow which Napoleon had decided on, encouraged by Joachim Murat who was blamed by many for the horse-killing pace of the march into Russia. Berthier is said to have burst into tears at the decision. He served in Germany in 1813, and France in 1814, fulfilling, until the fall of the French Empire, the functions of major-général of the Grande Armée.

Following Napoleon's first abdication, Berthier retired to his 600-acre (2.4 km²) estate, and resumed his hobbies of falconry and sculpture. He made peace with Louis XVIII in 1814 and accompanied the king on his solemn entry into Paris. During Napoleon's short exile on Elba, he informed Berthier of his projects. Berthier was much perplexed as to his future course and, being unwilling to commit to Napoleon, fell under the suspicion both of his old leader and of Louis XVIII.

On Napoleon's return to France, Berthier withdrew to Bamberg, where he died a few weeks later on 1 June 1815 in a fall from an upstairs window. The manner of his death is uncertain. According to some accounts, he was assassinated by members of a secret society, while others say that, maddened by the sight of Russian troops marching to invade France, he threw himself from his window and was killed.

The loss of Berthier's skills at Waterloo was keenly felt by Napoleon, as he later stated succinctly:

Character assessment
Berthier was an immensely skilled chief of staff, but he was not a great field commander. When he was in temporary command in 1809, the French army in Bavaria underwent a series of reverses. Despite the fact that his merit as a general was completely overshadowed by the genius of Napoleon, Berthier was nevertheless renowned for his excellent organising skills and being able to understand and carry out the emperor's directions to the minutest detail. General Paul Thiébault said of him in 1796:

No one could have better suited General Bonaparte, who wanted a man capable of relieving him of all detailed work, to understand him instantly and to foresee what he would need.

Marriage and family

In 1796, Berthier fell in love with Giuseppa Carcano, marquise Visconti di Borgorato, who was to be his mistress for the duration of the First French Empire, despite the emperor's disapproval. Even when Napoleon forced him to marry a Bavarian princess, the Duchess Maria Elisabeth, in 1808, Berthier managed to keep his mistress and his wife together under the same roof, a state of affairs which infuriated the emperor.

On 9 March 1808, Berthier married Elisabeth who was the only daughter of Duke Wilhelm in Bavaria and Countess Palatine Maria Anna of Zweibrücken-Birkenfeld-Rappoltstein, the sister of King Maximilian I Joseph of Bavaria, and a relative of the Russian emperor through the Wittelsbach line on the Bavarian side and Prussian (Mecklenburg) side of her lineage.

They had one son and two daughters :
 Napoléon-Alexandre, 2nd Duke and 2nd Prince of Wagram (11 September 1810 – 10 February 1887), married on 29 June 1831 to Zénaïde Françoise Clary (25 November 1812 – 27 April 1884). They had two daughters, Malcy Louise Caroline Frédérique Berthier Princess of Walgram (1832-1884), Elisabeth Alexandrine Maria Berthier Princess of Wagram (1849–1932) and a son, Louis Philippe Marie Alexandre Berthier, 3rd Prince of Wagram (1836–1911)
 Caroline-Joséphine, Princess of Wagram (22 August 1812 – 1905), married on 9 October 1832 to Alphonse Napoléon, Baron d'Hautpoul (29 May 1806 – 25 April 1889)
 Marie Anne Wilhelmine Alexandrine Elisabeth, Princess of Wagram (19 February 1816 – 23 July 1878). Born shortly after her father's death. Married on 24 June 1834 to Jules Lebrun, 3rd Duke of Plaisance (19 April 1811 – 15 January 1872)

In literature 
Berthier is mentioned and/or appears in several of Sir Arthur Conan Doyle's Brigadier Gerard stories, including How the Brigadier Was Tempted by the Devil (1895) and in Leo Tolstoy's War and Peace.

Notes

References
 

Attribution

Further reading
 Bukhari, Emir Napoleon's Marshals Osprey Publishing, 1979, .
 Chandler, David Napoleon's Marshals Macmillan Pub Co, 1987, .
 Connelly, Owen, Blundering to Glory: Napoleon's Military Campaigns SR Books, 1999, .
 Elting, John R. Swords around a Throne: Napoleon's Grande Armée Weidenfeld & Nicolson, 1997, .
 Haythornthwaite, Philip Napoleon's Commanders (2): c. 1809–15 Osprey Publishing, 2002, .
 Hittle, James Donald the Military Staff: Its History and Development Military Service Publishing, 1952.
 Macdonell, A. G. Napoleon and His Marshals Prion, 1997, .
 Pawly, Ronald Napoleon's Imperial Headquarters (1): Organization and Personnel Osprey Publishing, 2004, .
 Pawly, Ronald Napoleon's Imperial Headquarters (2): On campaign Osprey Publishing, 2004, .
 Watson, S.J. By Command of the Emperor: A Life of Marshal Berthier. Ken Trotman Ltd, .

Archive sources 
The Berthier collection is conserved in the archives of the State of Neuchâtel. It contains more than 2'000 items inventoried in 1895–1896 by Albert Dufourcq. The collection contains correspondence sent and received by the prince in connection with the general affairs of the Principality or particular affairs.

External links 

 Alex. Berthier, Relation of the Battle of Marengo
 Spencer Napoleonica Collection at Newberry Library
 
 
 Louis-Alexandre Berthier Collection Handcolored, topographical, manuscript maps (111 of them), created by Louis-Alexandre Berthier

1753 births
1815 deaths
18th-century French politicians
19th-century French sculptors
Commanders of the Order of Saint Louis
Deaths by defenestration
Dukes of the First French Empire
French male sculptors
French military personnel of the American Revolutionary War
French military personnel of the French Revolutionary Wars
French Ministers of War
Grand Croix of the Légion d'honneur
Grand Crosses of the Military Order of Max Joseph
Marshals of the First French Empire
Members of the Chamber of Peers of the Bourbon Restoration
Members of the Sénat conservateur
Military leaders of the French Revolutionary Wars
Names inscribed under the Arc de Triomphe
People from Versailles
Princes of Neuchâtel
Dukes of Wagram
Roman Republic (18th century)